Vilcha is a Ukrainian abandoned settlement and former urban-type settlement in the Chernobyl Exclusion Zone, part of Vyshhorod Raion, Kyiv Oblast.

History
The settlement was founded in 1926 on the site of a settlement named Oleksiivka. After the 1986 accident at the Chernobyl Nuclear Power Plant, 45 km far from Vilcha, the settlement was not included into the "Exclusion Zone" before 1993. During 1993 to 1996, most of the 2,000 residents moved to Kharkiv Oblast, where they founded a new Vilcha (709 km away), a few kilometres south of the town of Vovchansk.

The ghost town, today one of the checkpoints to the Exclusion Zone, was resettled by a few samosely some years later.

From February to April 2022, Vilcha was occupied by Russia as a result of the 2022 invasion.

Geography
Located near the borders with Zhytomyr Oblast and the Belarusian Oblast of Gomel, Vilcha is located in the middle of the natural region of Polesia, close to its radioecological reserve. It is 17 km from Poliske, 40 km from Krasiatychi (the raion's administrative seat), 43 km from Pripyat, 44 km from Ovruch and 95 km from Slavutych.

Transport
The settlement is crossed in the middle by the regional highway P02 Ovruch-Kyiv (150 km south), and is the southern end of the T1035 road from Oleksandrivka, Naroulia District, in Belarus, that continues as P37 highway to Naroulia and Mazyr (95 km north). It also has a railway station, officially in service but without passenger traffic, on the Chernihiv–Ovruch line.

Gallery

See also
Vilcha, Kharkiv Oblast
Chernobyl Exclusion Zone

References

External links

Urban-type settlements in Vyshhorod Raion
Ghost towns in the Chernobyl Exclusion Zone
Populated places disestablished in 1993
Belarus–Ukraine border crossings
Populated places established in 1926
1926 establishments in Ukraine
1993 disestablishments in Ukraine